I Remember Elvis is a studio album by American recording artist Wanda Jackson. It was released on January 31, 2006 via Goldenlane Records and contained 15 tracks. The album was a collection of rock and roll recordings all of which were made popular first by Elvis Presley. It was Presley who inspired Jackson to record rock and roll in her early career and ultimately influenced her musical trajectory. The album received positive reviews following its release.

Background
Wanda Jackson had first met up and coming Elvis Presley in the mid 1950s. The two were assigned on package shows across the United States and Jackson watched as his fame grew during the tour. The pair even began a brief romantic relationship during the same time period. It was Presley who inspired Jackson to record rock and roll by playing records made popular by R&B musicians. Jackson went on to record rock during the 1950s before transitioning to both country and gospel music. She returned to rock and roll in the 1980s and recorded several albums during that period. Jackson chose to record an album dedicated to Presley after realizing that it was important to thank her mentor. " I finally got the nerve to do it. To take an artist like Elvis and perform those songs is a very hard thing to do. I thought that if I was ever going to say “thank you,” then now is the time I should do it," she told The Independent.

Recording and content
Jackson recorded I Remember Elvis between July and September 2005. It was cut at three separate studios, all of which were located in California: Bedworth Studios, Redrum Studios and Stanley Recordings. The album was produced by Danny B. Harvey of the rock band The Head Cat. She chose to record songs from Presley's early catalog that she heard while on tour with him. "Those were the songs I got to watch and hear him sing. And they were the songs climbing up the Billboard charts when we were out on the road together," she recalled. It also features an audio discussion at the end of the disc where Jackson shares memories about Presley. A total of 16 tracks comprised the album.

The songs chosen for the project included Jackson's covers of "Heartbreak Hotel", "Good Rocking Tonight", "Love Me Tender" and "I Forgot to Remember to Forget". Country Standard Time described "Good Rockin' Tonight", "Tryin' to Get to You" and "Baby Let's Play House" as "bluesy" tracks that include Jackson's "trademark growl". The album also includes one new track dedicated to him titled "I Wore Elvis's Ring". The song is based on the true story of an actual ring given to Jackson by Presley once they began dating. She still has the ring today.

Critical reception

I Remember Elvis received positive reviews from critics and journalists. Mark Deming of AllMusic gave the project three and half stars in his review of the record. Deming described the musical sound as "classic rockabilly mode" but found that her voice had "started to show some slight signs of wear" yet also found that Jackson delivered "into these tunes with audible enthusiasm and a great feel for the material." Deming concluded by stating, "I Remember Elvis is something short of revelatory, but it is a sincere and loving tribute to an influential artist from someone who learned from him first-hand, and it proves that Jackson is still the Queen of Rock & Roll just as much as Elvis remains the King. Fine stuff. Billboard magazine gave the record a positive response in their review as well. Writers described Jackson as having "a pioneering role" in the shaping of early rock and roll.

Ken Burke of Country Standard Time gave the record a mostly positive response as well. Burke noted that she seemed "short of breath" on some songs but nonetheless stated that "the disc is worth buying if only to hear Jackson sing the catchy new ditty 'I Wore Elvis's Ring,' and talk about her brief romance with the young Elvis Presley. Jonathan Keefe of Slant Magazine praised Jackson's delivery of Presley's rock material: " Remember Elvis finds Jackson in trademark, fiery form."

Release and singles
I Remember Elvis was originally released on January 31, 2006 on Goldenlane Records. It was originally offered as both a compact disc and a vinyl LP. In the United Kingdom and Europe, it was released as Baby Let's Play House in 2011. It has since been released several more times under different titles. Jackson's cover of "Good Rockin' Tonight" was released as a single in 2007 on Goldenlane Records.

Track listings

Compact disc and digital versions

Vinyl version

Personnel
All credits are adapted from the liner notes of I Remember Elvis and AllMusic.

Musical personnel
 Clem Burke – Drums
 Danny B. Harvey – Background vocals, guitar
 Wanda Jackson – Lead vocals
 Lynda Kay Parker – Background vocals
 Racer X – Upright bass
 Don Randi – Piano
 John Would – Lap steel guitar

Technical personnel
 Gilby Clarke – Audio engineer
 Danny B. Harvey – Audio engineer, audio production, mixing, producer
 John Would – Audio engineer, mixing

Release history

References

2006 albums
Elvis Presley tribute albums
Wanda Jackson albums